Ancylosis brunneella is a species of snout moth in the genus Ancylosis. It was described by Pierre Chrétien in 1911 and is known from Spain, Algeria Morocco, Tunisia, Libya, Egypt, Sudan, Saudi Arabia and the Palestinian territories.

The wingspan is about 24 mm.

References

Moths described in 1911
brunneella
Moths of Africa
Moths of Europe
Moths of Asia